A metropolitan municipality is a municipality established in some areas of the world to serve a metropolitan area.

Canada

In generic terms and in practical application within Canada, a metropolitan municipality is an urban local government with partial or complete consolidation of city and county services.  The former Municipality of Metropolitan Toronto, 1954-1998, was created by partial amalgamation of the City of Toronto with neighbouring towns and townships in southerly York County, from which the metropolitan municipality was then extracted.  Each jurisdiction retained a degree of local autonomy, like the City of London and the boroughs in Greater London, while the Metropolitan government replaced the old county government and supervised metro-wide services, such as police, fire and ambulance.

Conversely, a rural area (or a suburban area flanked mostly by rural areas) in which county and municipal functions are wholly or partially consolidated is a regional municipality rather than a metropolitan municipality.  As with metropolitan municipalities, sub-regional communities - cities, villages, townships - within the regional municipality retain a degree of local autonomy, with the regional government focusing mostly on shared public services (police, drinking water, etc.).

European Union
Àrea Metropolitana de Barcelona
City State of Berlin
Brussels-Capital Region
Metropolitan Association of Upper Silesia
Greater Manchester
Greater London Authority
Metropolitan Stockholm
South Yorkshire
Tricity
Grande Área Metropolitana
Metropolitan municipalities of Italy

Europe/Asia

Iran
Tehran
Mashhad
Isfahan
Karaj
Tabriz
Shiraz
Ahvaz
Qom
Kermanshah
Urmia
Rasht
Zahedan
Kerman
Arak
Hamadan

Nepal

There are total 6 Metropolitan municipality in Nepal, which is called "Mahanagarpalika". There are another 11 Sub-metropolitan municipality in Nepal which called "Up-mahanagarpalika".

Metropolitan municipality
Kathmandu
Pokhara
Lalitpur
Bharatpur
Birgunj
Biratnagar

Sub-metropolitan municipality
Janakpur
Ghorahi
Hetauda
Dhangadhi
Tulsipur
Itahari
Nepalgunj
Butwal
Dharan
Kalaiya
Jitpur Simara

Turkey
Metropolitan municipalities are a form of local government with larger jurisdiction than municipalities in Turkey. These may be formed by presidential decree in any province with a provincial population (city center + outlying districts + villages) exceeding 750.000, as per the law governing metropolitan municipalities. Metropolitan municipalities enjoy juristiction in provincial borders, whereas "normal" municipalities are only tasked with governing their own district or the city center respectively. Metropolitan municipalities also take on the duties of the Special Provincial Administrations (turkish: İl Özel İdareleri) that are tasked with providing some municipal services in areas outside municipal limits. District municipalities become subordinate to the metropolitan municipality as second-level municipalities, and the metropolitan municipality takes on the name of the province. The city center is then made into its own district or districts, depending on size. As of 2022, there are 30 metropolitan municipalities in Turkey:
Istanbul
Izmir
Ankara
Bursa
Adana
Mersin
Antalya
Kocaeli
Aydın
Balıkesir
Denizli
Diyarbakır
Erzurum
Eskişehir
Gaziantep
Hatay
Kahramanmaraş
Kayseri
Konya
Malatya
Manisa
Mardin
Mersin
Muğla
Ordu
Sakarya
Samsun
Şanlıurfa
Tekirdağ
Trabzon
Uşak
Van

South Africa

See also
Amalgamation (politics)
Metropolitan county
Metropolitan borough
Sub-provincial city in the People's Republic of China

References

Municipalities
Political geography

es:Municipalidad metropolitana